American singer and songwriter Bonnie McKee has released one studio album, two extended plays, 10 singles (including three as a featured artist), three promotional singles, and 13 music videos.

Albums

Studio albums

Extended plays

Singles

As lead artist

As featured artist

Promotional singles

Special releases 

These songs were released onto McKee's Myspace account on November 26, 2008.

Music videos

Footnotes

See also 
 List of songs written by Bonnie McKee

References 

Discography
Discographies of American artists
Pop music discographies